Greg Jein (born October 31, 1945 in Los Angeles, USA; died May 22, 2022) was a Chinese American model designer who created miniatures for use in the special effects portions of many films and television series, beginning in the 1970s. Jein was nominated for an Academy Award for Best Visual Effects for his work on the films Close Encounters of the Third Kind (1977) and 1941 (1979), and also nominated for an Outstanding Special Visual Effects Emmy for his work on Angels in America.

Biography
One of Jein's first jobs was building models for the sex comedy spoof Flesh Gordon, this was followed by work on a number of television series, commercials and movies including Wonder Woman and The UFO Incident. In 1975 he was contacted by Douglas Trumbull's office and asked to do some work on Steven Spielberg's Close Encounters of the Third Kind. For that film Jein contributed a number of models including miniature landscapes for UFOs to fly over, but most significantly he and his crew built the detailed mothership model that features heavily in the final sequence of the film after Spielberg decided he wanted "a more flamboyant design". For their work Jein, Trumbull, Roy Arbogast, Matthew Yuricich, and Richard Yuricich were nominated for an Academy Award for Best Visual Effects at the 50th Academy Awards, but lost to the team who produced the effects for Star Wars. Jein then went on to work on Spielberg's next film 1941 where he and his team constructed a number of models including a twelve-foot model of the Ferris wheel is dislodged from its mount and  rolls down the pier and into the water. For their work on 1941 Jein, William A. Fraker and A. D. Flowers were nominated for an Academy Award for Best Visual Effects at the 52nd Academy Awards but lost this time to the team who provided the effects for Ridley Scott's Alien.

After working on 1941, Jein was invited by Douglas Trumbull to work on Star Trek: The Motion Picture building planetary models for Spock's spacewalk scene and the interior of the V'Ger craft. Jein continued his association with Star Trek through a number of the movies, building alien weapons for Star Trek V: The Final Frontier, and Starfleet helmets for the assassination scene in Star Trek VI: The Undiscovered Country. In 1986 he and a team at Industrial Light & Magic built the original six-foot model of the  designed by Andrew Probert for the pilot of Star Trek: The Next Generation. He would go on to build a number of models for The Next Generation including the Ferengi Marauder starship (also designed by Andrew Probert) during the first season of the show, and the Klingon Vor'cha (designed by Rick Sternbach) for the fourth season.

References

Sci-Fi and Fantasy Models magazine (UK) ran a two-part article called "So, you want to build effects miniatures?!" in issues 29 (pages 51–55) and 30 (pages 36–42), both dating from 1998. The article was by David Merriman; who was working as a subcontractor for Greg Jein. The first part includes pictures and text regarding work on a large Star Trek: The Next Generation filming model of the Enterprise-D. The second part includes pictures and text about a smaller model of the same craft; plus work on a model of the Enterprise-C and a Klingon spacecraft. Merriman also discusses unique models he built for use on episodes of Doctor Madblood.
Fantastic Films magazine, volume 1 number 4, dated October 1978, included a cover article (9 pages) by James Delson, entitled "An interview with Greg Jein: maker of the mothership from Close Encounters and other interstellar craft from Flesh Gordon, Dark Star, Laserblast, The UFO Incident and more...".

External links

1945 births
2022 deaths
Special effects people
Miniature model-makers
People from Los Angeles